Tarom County is in Zanjan province, Iran. The capital of the county is the city of Ab Bar. At the 2006 census, the county's population was 42,939 in 10,734 households. The following census in 2011 counted 46,616 people in 13,221 households. At the 2016 census, the county's population was 46,641 in 14,438 households.

Administrative divisions

The population history of Tarom County's administrative divisions over three consecutive censuses is shown in the following table. The latest census shows two districts, five rural districts, and two cities.

History 
The region of Tarom is historically divided into two parts: Upper Tarom and Lower Tarom. Medieval Arabic geographers usually wrote the name as aṭ-Ṭārumayn, or "the two Taroms", reflecting this division. The mountainous Upper Tarom was historically counted as part of Daylam. The name "Tarom" was applied to a right-bank tributary of the Sefid Rud, and the region of Tarom comprised the river and its own tributaries.

An important location in Tarom was the castle and town of Semiran, which lay in Lower Tarom on the main highway leading to Sarab. The castle crowned a rocky mount above the lower town and had triple walls. Ibn Muhalhal visited here  943 and wrote that it was one of the main strongholds of the Daylamite kings and had about 2,850 houses. The Buyid amir Fakhr al-Dawla captured Semiran in 989 from the Vahsudan dynasty. Al-Muqaddasi wrote about the same time that the fortress of Semiran had "lions of gold, and the sun and the moon" on its walls; the town's houses were built from mud brick. He counted Semiran as part of the Salārvand district. Nasir-i Khusraw visited Semiran in 1046 during his pilgrimage to Mecca; he described it as the capital of Tarom. Its fortress, he wrote, was garrisoned by a thousand men and had an underground conduit to supply water. By the time Yaqut al-Hamawi visited Semiran in the early 1200s, the castle had been slighted by the Nizaris, although the ruins were still impressive enough that Yaqut called it "a mother of castles".

Another fortress that Yaqut mentioned was Qilāt, located in the mountains on the Daylam frontier. It was located atop a mountain and had belonged to the Nizaris of Alamut. Below it was a town with "excellent" markets; there was also a masonry bridge with many arches crossing the stream.

In the Nuzhat al-Qulub 
The 14th-century author Hamdallah Mustawfi gave a detailed description of the two Taroms in his Nuzhat al-Qulub. He described the two regions as fertile for agriculture – they supplied the city of Soltaniyeh with most of its fruit, he wrote – and populated mostly by Sunnis of the Shafi'i madhhab. He wrote that a town called Firuzabad, which was in Lower Tarom, had formerly been the capital of the region, but by his lifetime Firuzabad had become "a complete ruin". A place called Andar, which was in Upper Tarom, had replaced it as Tarom's capital.

Mustawfi described the two Taroms as being divided into five districts. The first consisted of the dependencies of Qal'ah Tāj ("the crown castle"), which was in Upper Tarom. He said this district included about 100 villages; the most important were Jazlā, Shūrzad, Darām, Ḥayāt, Qalāt, Razīd, and Shīd. The second district was based around the castle of Semiran, in Lower Tarom. This district had about 50 villages, with the most important being Alūn, Khawarnaq, Sharzūrlard, and Kalach. The third district was based around the castle of Firdaws, also in Lower Tarom; this district comprised about 20 villages, with the most important being Sarvān. The fourth district was based around, instead of a castle, two large villages: Nisbār and Barīdūn. It consisted of 8 hamlets that were dependencies of the two main villages. Mustawfi did not specified whether this district belonged to Upper or Lower Tarom. The fifth and final district was Lower Dizābād; Mustawfi said nothing about this district's affiliation either. In any case, it had 25 villages; the most important were Gulhār, Gulchīn, and Balhal. The combined revenue of these five districts, according to Mustawfi, was 64,000 dinars.

Geology 
Tarom is part of the Tarom-Hashtjin Metallogenic Province, which is one of the most important epithermal regions in Iran. Lead, zinc, copper, iron, and manganese are prevalent. Compared to the Hashtjin part, copper and iron are more widespread in Tarom. The average copper content of plutonic bodies ranges from 220 to 260 ppm. Lead, zinc, and silver content are 600, 800, and 8 ppm respectively. Gold deposits are found mixed in with some copper deposits, such as at Khalifeloo, Abbasabad, and Chargar. There are also gold deposits at Asadi and Ghez Ghal'e. Tarom also has relatively more alunite deposits than Hashtjin, including ones at Yuzbash Chay, Kamar Rud, Nasr Abad, Sirdan, Zajkan, and Zajkandi. There are also minor tungsten deposits, such as at Kuhian. Sericitization is less widespread in Tarom than in Hashtjin, and "greisen-type metasomatism" has not been reported in Tarom.

References

 

Counties of Zanjan Province